Meadow Lake is a provincial electoral district for the Legislative Assembly of Saskatchewan, Canada. Incorporated as a city in 2009, Meadow Lake (pop. 5,045) is the largest centre in the constituency.

The riding was last contested in the 2020 election, when incumbent Saskatchewan Party MLA Jeremy Harrison was re-elected.

Smaller communities in the riding include the villages of Green Lake, Loon Lake, Leoville, and Goodsoil; and the town of St. Walburg.

History 

Since it was first contested in the 1991 election, where it was won by NDP candidate Maynard Sonntag. Sonntag held the riding until the 2007 election, when Jeremy Harrison of the Saskatchewan Party was elected. It has been represented by the Saskatchewan Party since.

Members of the Legislative Assembly

Election results

History

Members of the Legislative Assembly

References

External links 
Website of the Legislative Assembly of Saskatchewan
Saskatchewan Archives Board – Saskatchewan Election Results By Electoral Division

Meadow Lake, Saskatchewan
Saskatchewan provincial electoral districts